The Great Northfield, Minnesota Raid is a 1972 American Western film about the James-Younger Gang distributed by Universal Pictures. It was written and directed by Philip Kaufman in a cinéma vérité style and starring Cliff Robertson. The film purports to recreate the James-Younger Gang's most infamous escapade, the September 7, 1876, robbery of "the biggest bank west of the Mississippi", in Northfield, Minnesota.

Plot
In the mid 1870s, outlaws Jesse James, Cole Younger and their brothers are granted amnesty by the Missouri legislature, sympathetic to the troubles created for all citizens by the American Civil War. The bankers victimized by the James and Younger gangs are vehemently opposed to this action and hire a Pinkerton agent to follow the outlaws' every move.

Younger has put aside plans to rob a bank in Northfield, Minnesota, said to be the largest west of the Mississippi River. The job appeals, however, to Jesse and Frank James, who have no intention of changing the way they make a living.

Cole is ambushed by the Pinkerton's agent men, who use a prostitute as bait. And when the bankers succeed in overturning the amnesty by bribing the politicians, Cole travels by train to Minnesota to check out the bank.

Once there, Cole discovers that townspeople are unwilling to risk placing their money in the bank owing to concerns over its safety from thieves. Jesse, Frank, and their men arrive on horseback and, together with Cole, persuade the locals that a gold shipment is on its way to the bank because it is supposed to be the safest possible place for it.

Once the citizens begin banking their money, the robbery commences. Many things go wrong, though, including one outlaw being locked inside a vault. Cole Younger and his men flee to a nearby farm, but a posse tracks and apprehends them. The James brothers get away. But when Jesse mentions to Frank his intention to permit Bob Ford to join the gang back in Missouri, his fate is sealed.

Cast
 Cliff Robertson as Cole Younger
 Robert Duvall as Jesse James
 Luke Askew as Jim Younger
 R. G. Armstrong as Clell Miller
 Dana Elcar as Allen
 Donald Moffat as Manning
 John Pearce as Frank James
 Matt Clark as Bob Younger
 Wayne Sutherlin as Charley Pitts
 Robert H. Harris as Wilcox
 Jack Manning as Heywood
 Elisha Cook as Bunker (as Elisha Cook)
 Royal Dano as Gustavson
 Mary-Robin Redd as Kate
 William Callaway as Callipist (as Bill Callaway)
 Arthur Peterson as Jefferson Jones
 Craig Curtis as Chadwell
 Barry Brown as Henry Wheeler
 Nellie Burt as Doll Woman
 Liam Dunn as Drummer
 Madeleine Taylor Holmes as Granny Woman
 Herbert Nelson as Chief Detective
 Erik Holland as Sheriff 
 Anne Barton as Clell's Wife
 Marjorie Durant as Maybelle
 Inger Stratton as Singing Whore
 Valda Hansen as Nude Girl (as Valda J. Hansen)

Production
The film was shot in Jacksonville, Oregon. It is classified by AllMovie as a revisionist Western and a crime drama.

See also
 List of American films of 1972

References

External links
 
 
 
 
 

1972 films
1972 Western (genre) films
American Western (genre) films
Biographical films about Jesse James
1972 crime drama films
1970s English-language films
Films about bank robbery
Films directed by Philip Kaufman
Films scored by Dave Grusin
Films set in 1876
Films set in Minnesota
Films shot in Oregon
Revisionist Western (genre) films
Universal Pictures films
1970s American films